|}

The Irish Grand National is a National Hunt steeplechase in Ireland which is open to horses aged five years or older. It is run at Fairyhouse over a distance of about 3 miles and 5 furlongs (5,834 metres), and during its running there are twenty-four fences to be jumped. It is a handicap race, and it is scheduled to take place each year on Easter Monday.

It is the Irish equivalent of the Grand National, and it is held during Fairyhouse's Easter Festival meeting.

History
The event was established in 1870, and the inaugural running was won by a horse called Sir Robert Peel. The race took place at its present venue, and the winner's prize money was 167 sovereigns. In the early part of its history it was often won by horses trained at the Curragh, and there were ten such winners by 1882. The Easter Monday fixture regularly attracted racegoers from Dublin, and it became known as the Dubs' Day Out.

Several winners of the Irish Grand National have also won its English counterpart at Aintree, but none in the same year. The first to complete the double was Ascetic's Silver, the winner of the latter version in 1906. The feat has been achieved more recently by Rhyme 'n' Reason, Bobbyjo and Numbersixvalverde. The most successful horse in the event's history is Brown Lad, a three-time winner in the 1970s.

Since 1991, the distance of the race has been 3 miles and 5 furlongs; previously it had been 3 miles and 4 furlongs.

The Irish Grand National was sponsored by Irish Distillers under various titles for many years up to 2010.  Ladbrokes sponsored the race from 2011 to 2013. In 2014, Boylesports took over as Irish Grand National sponsor and appointed the jockey Barry Geraghty as the first ever ambassador for the race, promoting the race through various channels, including social media.

Records

Winners since 1946
 Weights given in stones and pounds.

Earlier winners

 1870 – Sir Robert Peel
 1871 – The Doe
 1872 – Scots Grey
 1873 – Torrent
 1874 – Sailor
 1875 – Scots Grey
 1876 – Grand National
 1877 – Thiggin-Thue
 1878 – Juggler
 1879 – Jupiter Tonans
 1880 – Controller
 1881 – Antoinette
 1882 – Chantilly
 1883 – The Gift
 1884 – The Gift
 1885 – Billet Doux
 1886 – Castle Lucas
 1887 – Eglentine
 1888 – The Maroon
 1889 – The Citadel
 1890 – Greek Girl
 1891 – Old Tom
 1892 – Springfield Maid
 1893 – Thurles
 1894 – The Admiral
 1895 – Yellow Girl II
 1896 – Royston Crow
 1897 – Breemount's Pride
 1898 – Porridge
 1899 – Princess Hilda
 1900 – Mavis of Meath
 1901 – Tipperary Boy
 1902 – Patlander
 1903 – Kirko
 1904 – Ascetic's Silver
 1905 – Red Lad
 1906 – Brown Bess
 1907 – Sweet Cecil
 1908 – Lord Rivers
 1909 – Little Hack II
 1910 – Oniche
 1911 –  II
 1912 – Small Polly
 1913 – Little Hack II
 1914 – Civil War
 1915 – Punch
 1916 – All Sorts
 1917 – Pay Only
 1918 – Ballyboggan
 1919 – no race
 1920 – Halston
 1921 – Bohernore
 1922 – Halston
 1923 – Be Careful
 1924 – Kilbarry
 1925 – Dog Fox
 1926 – Amberwave
 1927 – Jerpoint
 1928 – Don Sancho
 1929 – Alike
 1930 – Fanmond
 1931 – Impudent Barney
 1932 – Copper Court
 1933 – Red Park
 1934 – Poolgowran
 1935 – Rathfriland
 1936 – Alice Maythorn
 1937 – Pontet
 1938 – Clare County
 1939 – Shaun Peel
 1940 – Jack Chaucer
 1941 – no race
 1942 – Prince Regent
 1943 – Golden Jack
 1944 – Knight's Crest
 1945 – Heirdom

See also
 Horse racing in Ireland
 List of Irish National Hunt races

References

 Racing Post:

 pedigreequery.com – Irish Grand National – Fairyhouse.
 tbheritage.com – Irish Grand National winners.

Further reading

The Sweeney guide to the Irish turf from 1501 to 2001 /
by Tony & Annie Sweeney in association with Francis Hyland ; photographs by Caroline Norris ... [et al.].

National Hunt races in Ireland
National Hunt chases
Recurring sporting events established in 1870
Fairyhouse Racecourse
1870 establishments in Ireland